Believe Me may refer to:
"Believe Me", a song by American group, The Royal Teens, 1959
"Believe Me" (Fort Minor song), 2005
"Believe Me" (The Guess Who song), 1966
"Believe Me" (Lil Wayne song), 2014
"Believe Me" (Melody song), 2004
"Believe Me" (Usher song), 2014
"Believe Me" (Yulia Savicheva song), 2004
Believe Me (film), 2014 film
"Believe Me", a song by Fleetwood Mac from the Rumours sessions
"Believe Me", a song by the Beastie Boys from Aglio e Olio
"Believe Me", a song by Ellie Goulding on the album Bright Lights
"Believe Me", a song by Seabird from Rocks into Rivers

See also
Believe Me, If All Those Endearing Young Charms